Emma may refer to:
 Emma (given name)

Film
 Emma (1932 film), a comedy-drama film by Clarence Brown
 Emma (1996 theatrical film), a film starring Gwyneth Paltrow
 Emma (1996 TV film), a British television film starring Kate Beckinsale
 Emma (2020 film), a British drama film starring Anya Taylor-Joy

Literature
 Emma (novel), an 1815 novel by Jane Austen
 Emma Brown, a fragment of a novel by Charlotte Brontë, completed by Clare Boylan in 2003
 Emma, a 1955 novel by F. W. Kenyon
 Emma: A Modern Retelling, a 2015 novel by Alexander McCall Smith
 Emma (manga), a 2002 manga by Kaoru Mori and the adapted Japanese animated series
 EMMA (magazine), a German feminist journal, published by Alice Schwarzer

Music

Artists
 E.M.M.A., a 2001–2005 Swedish girl group
 Emma (Welsh singer) (born 1974)
 Emma Bunton (born 1976), English singer
 Emma Marrone or Emma (born 1984), Italian singer

Songs
 "Emma" (Hot Chocolate song), 1974
 "Emma" (Little River Band song), 1975
 "Emma", a 2003 song by Alkaline Trio from Good Mourning
 "Emma", a 2010 song by Imagine Dragons from Hell and Silence
 "Emma", a song by Jonathan Edwards from Jonathan Edwards

Places in the United States
 Emma, Indiana
 Emma, Illinois
 Emma, Kentucky
 Emma, Louisiana
 Emma, Missouri
 Emma, North Carolina
 Emma, West Virginia

People
 Emma of Austrasia (fl. 7th century), daughter of Theudebert II and possibly wife of Eadbald of Kent
 Emma of Normandy (c. 985–1052), twice Queen consort of the Kingdom of England by marriage
 Queen Emma of Hawaii (1836–1885), queen to King Kamehameha IV from 1856 to his death in 1863
 Emma of Waldeck and Pyrmont (1858–1934), Queen consort of William III of the Netherlands and Grand Duke of Luxembourg
 Emma (wrestler) or Tenille Dashwood (born 1989), Australian wrestler

Television
 Emma (1972 TV serial), a British TV six-part series starring Doran Godwin
 Emma (anime), a Japanese television series broadcast in 2005 and 2007
 Emma (2009 TV serial), a British TV serial starring Romola Garai
 Emma (TV series), a VH1 music video program hosted by Emma Bunton

Transportation
 , any one of several merchant ships of that name
 HMS Queen Emma, a 1939 troopship of the Royal Navy during the Second World War
 USS Emma (1863), a screw steamer
 USS Emma (SP-1223), a patrol boat in non-commissioned service from 1917 to 1918

Other uses
 EMMA (accelerator) or Electron Machine with Many Applications
 EMMA (code coverage tool)
 Emma (play), a 1976 play by Howard Zinn about Emma Goldman
 Emma (satellite)
 283 Emma, a main-belt asteroid
 Emma-gaala, a Finnish music award
 Electronic Municipal Market Access (EMMA)
 Espoo Museum of Modern Art (EMMA)
 Ethnic Multicultural Media Academy, an organization that raises awareness of discrimination
 Experiment with MultiMuon Array (EMMA)
 Degtyaryov machine gun or Emma, a Soviet machine gun of 1928
 Emmanuel College, Cambridge or Emma, a constituent college of Cambridge University
 Emma, a keytar instrument used by Lady Gaga on The Monster Ball Tour

People with the surname
 Brandi Emma (born 1983), American actress and singer-songwriter
 David Emma (born 1969), American retired ice hockey player

See also
 Emma Mærsk, first in the Maersk E-class 11,000-TEU container ships
 List of ships named Emma
 Saint Emma (disambiguation)
 List of storms named Emma
 USS Emma, a list of ships
 Yama (Buddhism) or Enma, Buddhist god of death